The Peoples Savings Bank in Cedar Rapids, Iowa, was designed by Louis Sullivan.  It was the second of a number of small "jewel box" banks in midwest towns designed by Sullivan during 1907 to 1919.  It was built in 1911, and it was individually listed on the National Register of Historic Places in 1978.  In 2014 it was included as a contributing property in the West Side Third Avenue SW Commercial Historic District.

History 
Sullivan's initial design was completed in the summer of 1909 but was rejected by the bank as being too expensive.  The following year his Cedar Rapids clients, spearheaded by the bank Vice-President Fred Shaver (whom local Cedar Rapids tradition has Sullivan designing a remodeling of his residence),  continued their negotiations with him and an agreement was reached.  Sullivan began this study of the bank and its functions beginning with the large banking room and working out from there while reducing the cost of the structure by cutting back on the terra cotta ornamentation. The building was finished in 1912.

The prominent architectural critic Montgomery Schuyler said of it at the time that, "The building is thus clearly designed from within outward. The exterior is the envelope of the interior reduced to its very simplest expression." (Wilson and Robinson)

The bricks for the exterior of the building were produced in 15 different shades, producing, as Sullivan remarked, "the effect of an antique Oriental rug." The interior of the building includes clerestory walls of glass with murals by Allen Philbrick depicting life in rural Iowa.

This bank was the last commission that George Elmslie assisted Sullivan on. Shortly after its completion Elmslie joined the Minnesota partnership of Purcell & Feick, the new firm being named Purcell, Feick & Elmslie.

Peoples Bank was purchased around 1989 by Minneapolis-based Norwest Corporation, which a few years later acquired Wells Fargo and took on its name.  The Third Avenue building continued to serve as the Cedar Rapids/Marion area's main Wells Fargo branch, but because of its proximity to the Cedar River, it was impacted by the Great Iowa Flood of 2008. As such, the main bank is currently closed. Wells Fargo's Web site says the adjacent motor bank is operating, however.

Gallery

Other Louis Sullivan "jewel boxes"
Farmers and Merchants Bank, Columbus, Wisconsin (1919)
Henry Adams Building, Algona, Iowa (1913)
Home Building Association Company, Newark, Ohio (1914)
Merchants' National Bank, Grinnell, Iowa (1914)
National Farmer's Bank, Owatonna, Minnesota (1908)
People's Federal Savings and Loan Association, Sidney, Ohio (1918)
Purdue State Bank, West Lafayette, Indiana (1914)

References

Further reading 
Elia, Mario Manieri, Louis Henry Sullivan, Princeton Architectural Press, Princeton NY, 1996
Gebhard, David & Gerald Mansheim, Building of Iowa, Oxford University Press, New York,  1993
Kvaran, Einar Einarsson, The Louis Sullivan Pilgrimage, unpublished manuscript
Twombly, Robert, Louis Sullivan: His Life and Work, Elizabeth Sifton Books - Viking, New York,  1986
Wilson, Richard Guy and Sidney K. Robinson, The Prairie School in Iowa, Iowa State University Press, Ames, Iowa,  1977

Commercial buildings completed in 1909
Louis Sullivan buildings
Buildings and structures in Cedar Rapids, Iowa
Bank buildings on the National Register of Historic Places in Iowa
National Register of Historic Places in Cedar Rapids, Iowa
Art Nouveau architecture in Iowa
Art Nouveau commercial buildings
Individually listed contributing properties to historic districts on the National Register in Iowa